Ilse Sophie von Platen (1731–1795), was a German court official.  

She was the lady-in-waiting (Hofdame) to Sophia Dorothea of Hanover. She is portrayed in the Fünf Schlösser by Theodor Fontane.

References 

1731 births
1795 deaths
German ladies-in-waiting